The Landrat of Uri is the legislature of the canton of Uri, in Switzerland.  Uri has a unicameral legislature.  The Cantonal Council has 64 seats, with members elected every four years.  After the 2012 election, one of the seats remained vacant with a second election on 15 April 2012 to fill it.

Elections

2012 election 

|-
! style="background-color:#E9E9E9;text-align:left;" colspan=2 |Party
! style="background-color:#E9E9E9;text-align:left;" width=150px |Ideology
! style="background-color:#E9E9E9;text-align:right;" width=50px |Seats
! style="background-color:#E9E9E9;text-align:right;" width=50px |Seats ±
|-
| style="background-color: " |
| style="text-align:left;" | Christian Democratic People's Party
| style="text-align:left;" | Christian democracy
| style="text-align:right;" | 23
| style="text-align:right;" | -1
|-
| style="background-color: " |
| style="text-align:left;" | FDP.The Liberals
| style="text-align:left;" | Classical liberalism
| style="text-align:right;" | 14
| style="text-align:right;" | +2
|-
| style="background-color: " |
| style="text-align:left;" | Social Democratic Party/Green Party
| style="text-align:left;" | Social democracy/Green politics
| style="text-align:right;" | 11
| style="text-align:right;" | +1
|-
| style="background-color: " |
| style="text-align:left;" | Swiss People's Party
| style="text-align:left;" | National conservatism
| style="text-align:right;" | 14
| style="text-align:right;" | -4
|-
| |
| style="text-align:left;" | Unaffiliated
| style="text-align:left;" | N/A
| style="text-align:right;" | 1
| style="text-align:right;" | +1
|- style="background: #E9E9E9"
! style="text-align:left;" colspan=3| Total

| 63
| style="text-align:right;" | –
|-
| colspan=6 style="text-align:left;" | Source: Canton of Uri
|}

2016 election 

|-
! style="background-color:#E9E9E9;text-align:left;" colspan=2 |Party
! style="background-color:#E9E9E9;text-align:left;" width=150px |Ideology
! style="background-color:#E9E9E9;text-align:right;" width=50px |Seats
! style="background-color:#E9E9E9;text-align:right;" width=50px |Seats ±
|-
| style="background-color: " |
| style="text-align:left;" | Christian Democratic People's Party
| style="text-align:left;" | Christian democracy
| style="text-align:right;" | 22
| style="text-align:right;" | -1
|-
| style="background-color: " |
| style="text-align:left;" | FDP.The Liberals
| style="text-align:left;" | Classical liberalism
| style="text-align:right;" | 18
| style="text-align:right;" | +2
|-
| style="background-color: " |
| style="text-align:left;" | Social Democratic Party/Green Party
| style="text-align:left;" | Social democracy/Green politics
| style="text-align:right;" | 9
| style="text-align:right;" | -2
|-
| style="background-color: " |
| style="text-align:left;" | Swiss People's Party
| style="text-align:left;" | National conservatism
| style="text-align:right;" | 15
| style="text-align:right;" | 1
|-
! style="text-align:left;" colspan=3| Total

| 64
| style="text-align:right;" | –
|-
| colspan=6 style="text-align:left;" | Source:
|}

2020 election 

|-
! style="background-color:#E9E9E9;text-align:left;" colspan=2 |Party
! style="background-color:#E9E9E9;text-align:left;" width=150px |Ideology
! style="background-color:#E9E9E9;text-align:right;" width=50px |Seats
! style="background-color:#E9E9E9;text-align:right;" width=50px |Seats ±
|-
| style="background-color: " |
| style="text-align:left;" | Christian Democratic People's Party
| style="text-align:left;" | Christian democracy
| style="text-align:right;" | 25
| style="text-align:right;" | 3
|-
| style="background-color: " |
| style="text-align:left;" | FDP.The Liberals
| style="text-align:left;" | Classical liberalism
| style="text-align:right;" | 16
| style="text-align:right;" | 2
|-
| style="background-color: " |
| style="text-align:left;" | Swiss People's Party
| style="text-align:left;" | National conservatism
| style="text-align:right;" | 14
| style="text-align:right;" | 1
|-
| style="background-color: " |
| style="text-align:left;" | Social Democratic Party/Green Party
| style="text-align:left;" | Social democracy/Green politics
| style="text-align:right;" | 9
| style="text-align:right;" | 0
|-
! style="text-align:left;" colspan=3| Total
| 64
| style="text-align:right;" | –
|-
| colspan=6 style="text-align:left;" | Source:
|}

References

Uri
Canton of Uri
Uri